The New Hampshire Liberty Alliance (NHLA) is a nonpartisan, libertarian coalition in New Hampshire. The organization supports libertarian candidates for state and local offices, and other libertarian causes and organizations.

Just before the November elections in 2006, the New Hampshire Union Leader editor wrote, "if New Hampshire is to remain the live free or die state, we have to continue voting for freedom and against government coercion."  The editor wrote, "we are not with the Alliance on every single issue, but their scorecard is a good proxy for determining who is a friend or foe of personal freedoms" about the NHLA in the same editorial.

The Liberty Alliance is not part of the Free State Project, but has participated in that group's annual New Hampshire Liberty Forum.

Liberty Dinner
The NHLA hosts an annual Liberty Dinner at which the Liberty Rating, a report card based on votes by legislators and the impact of those votes on New Hampshire, is unveiled. It also features issuance of a "Legislator of the Year" award to a member of the New Hampshire State Legislature and an "Activist of the Year" award.

Speakers at the Liberty Dinner have included Healing Our World author and 2008 Libertarian Party presidential candidate Dr. Mary Ruwart in 2015, New Hampshire Union Leader publisher Joe McQuaid, New Hampshire Secretary of State Bill Gardner, and American Federation for Children senior fellow Corey DeAngelis.

See also

 Politics of New Hampshire

References

External links
 Official website

Organizations based in New Hampshire
Politics of New Hampshire
Libertarian organizations based in the United States